Hans Schneeberger (7 April 1895 – 19 November 1971) was an Austrian cinematographer who worked on over eighty films during his career. During the 1920s and early 1930s Schneeberger worked frequently with the director Arnold Fanck, including films starring Leni Riefenstahl. 
Schneeberger also made a handful of acting appearances, including playing opposite Riefenstahl in The Great Leap (1927). He filmed the famous final shot in The Third Man but was not credited. Schneeberger was later employed by the largest Austrian company Wien-Film for a number of productions.

Selected filmography

Cinematographer
 The Holy Mountain (1926)
 Melody of the Heart (1929)
 The Wonderful Lies of Nina Petrovna (1929)
 The White Hell of Pitz Palu (1929)
 The Blue Light (1932)
 Miracle of Flight (1935)
 Conquest of the Air (1936)
 Forget Me Not (1936)
 Farewell Again (1937)
 The Tiger of Eschnapur (1938)
 The Indian Tomb (1938)
 Comrades at Sea (1938)
 Frau Sixta (1938)
 Target in the Clouds (1939)
 Linen from Ireland (1939)
 A Mother's Love (1939)
 Immortal Waltz (1939)
 Operetta (1940)
 Destiny (1942)
 Vienna 1910 (1943)
 Late Love (1943)
 The White Dream (1943)
 The Queen of the Landstrasse (1948)
 Mysterious Shadows (1949)
 The Fourth Commandment (1950)
 Cordula (1950)
 The Lie (1950)
 Jonny Saves Nebrador (1953)
 A Musical War of Love (1953)
 The Witch (1954)
 It Was Always So Nice With You (1954)
 Fruit Without Love (1956)
 Melody of the Heath (1956)
 The Elephant in a China Shop (1958)
 Mandolins and Moonlight (1959)
 William Tell (1960)

References

Bibliography
 Hinton, David B. The Films of Leni Riefenstahl. Scarecrow Press, 2000.

External links

 Hans Schneeberger as Michael Treuherz

1895 births
1971 deaths
Austrian male silent film actors
Austrian male film actors
Austrian cinematographers
People from Tyrol (state)
20th-century Austrian male actors